Netechma otongana is a species of moth of the family Tortricidae. It is found in Cotopaxi Province, Ecuador.

The wingspan is 18 mm. The ground colour of the forewings is white, but cream in the basal portion. The markings and dots are black. The hindwings are brownish, but whitish at the base.

Etymology
The species name refers to Otonga, the type locality.

References

Moths described in 2008
Netechma